The Royal Netherlands Watersport Association is the national governing body for the sports of sailing, surfing, and canoeing in the Netherlands, recognised by the World Sailing.

History
Founded in 1890 as Koninlijk Verbond Nederlandsche Watersport Verenigingen.

Notable sailors
See :Category:Dutch sailors

Olympic sailing
See Dutch Olympic Sailing Team

Offshore sailing
See :Category:Dutch sailors (sport)

Yacht Clubs
See :Category:Yacht clubs in the Netherlands

References

External links
 

1890 establishments in the Netherlands
Netherland
Organisations based in the Netherlands with royal patronage
Sailing associations
Sailing
Yachting associations